The Statutory Gas Companies (Electricity Supply Powers) Act 1925 (15 & 16 Geo. 5. c. 44) is an Act of the Parliament of the United Kingdom which facilitated the supply of electricity by gas companies.

Background 
The spread of electricity supplies in rural areas in the UK had been limited because of the cost distribution infrastructure. Yet, the advantages of using electricity for lighting rather than gas were recognised. Gas companies were able to use surplus power from the gas making process to generate and supply electricity. Twenty-four gas companies had, by 1925, obtained legal powers to supply electricity. However, this required the company to promote a Bill in Parliament which was a prohibitive cost for smaller gas companies.

The aim of the Act was to enable Statutory Gas Companies to apply for Special Orders under the Electricity Acts. It enabled companies to raise capital or borrow money to provide an electricity supply. The Electricity Commissioners were empowered to grant money control powers to gas companies, including those already authorised to supply electricity.

Statutory Gas Companies (Electricity Supply Powers) Act 1925 
The Statutory Gas Companies (Electricity Supply Powers) Act 1925 received Royal Assent on 31 July 1925. Its long title is ‘An Act to facilitate the supply of electricity by statutory gas companies’.

Provisions 
The Act comprised four Sections:

Section 1 Granting Electricity Orders to statutory gas companies

Section 2 Providing capital powers to statutory gas companies

Section 3 Definition of statutory gas companies

Section 4 Short title

Effects of the Act 
To deal with the applications for financial powers the Electricity Commissioners made Rules of Procedure. These were enacted by the Electricity Commissioners (Statutory Gas Companies Capital Powers) Rules 1926.  A schedule of Special Orders is listed in Appendix K of the Electricity Commissioner Sixth Annual Report 1926.

Repeal 
The Act was repealed by Schedule 5 of the Electricity Act 1947.

See also 

 Timeline of the UK electricity supply industry
 Electricity Commissioners

References 

United Kingdom Acts of Parliament 1925
Electric power in the United Kingdom